La Encrucijada, or La Encrucijada de Turmero, is a strategic road junction near Turmero, Venezuela.  It is also planned to be a rail junction.

Road
At this point, about 72 km south-west of Caracas, the Autopista Regional del Centro (Central Regional Highway) intersects with other major highways.

Rail

Turmero had a station on the Great Venezuela Railway between Caracas and Valencia. This line opened in the 1890s and closed in the 1960s.

With the revival of rail in Venezuela, La Encrucijada is planned to be the site of an important rail junction, linking a route to the Caribbean port of Puerto Cabello (which roughly follows the routes of defunct 19th century railway lines) with new routes into the interior of Venezuela, such as a line south across the Llanos. However, while some construction has taken place with Italian and Chinese involvement, it appears to have come to a halt. In 2016 it was reported that investments in the Venezuelan rail system had become risky.

References

Populated places in Aragua
Road interchanges
Road transport in Venezuela